General elections were held in Jamaica in September 1884. Eight of the nine constituencies were contested, with only the candidate in St Mary & St Ann returned unopposed.

Background
In 1866 the Jamaican House of Assembly had been abolished during disturbances on the island following the Morant Bay rebellion. Since then, the legislative functions of the Assembly had been used by a Council appointed by the Governor. In April 1884 a conference was at the Westminster Palace Hotel, which resulted in the re-establishment of an elected Assembly. The new Assembly would consist of nine elected members and six appointed members.

Results

References

1884 in Jamaica
Elections in Jamaica
1884 elections in the Caribbean
September 1884 events